Samy Shoker (born 1987) is an Egyptian chess grandmaster.

Chess career
Born in 1987, Shoker earned his international master (IM) title in 2006 and was awarded the title of grandmaster (GM) by FIDE in 2014. He played in the Chess World Cup 2013, where he was defeated in the first round by Shakhriyar Mamedyarov. He represented his country at the 2014 Chess Olympiad, scoring 4½/9 (+4–4=1).

References

External links 
 
 Samy Shoker chess games at 365Chess.com
 

1987 births
Living people
Chess grandmasters
Egyptian chess players